KDXE (101.1 MHz, "101.1 FM The Answer") is an FM radio station broadcasting a conservative talk format in Little Rock, Arkansas (licensed to enclave Cammack Village). The station is currently owned by Salem Media Group, through licensee Salem Communications Holding Corporation. The station's studios are south of downtown near Philander Smith College, and the transmitter tower is located on Shinall Mountain, near the Chenal Valley neighborhood of Little Rock.

On June 1, 1998, after a 10-day stunt with various genres of music, 101.1 FM signed on as modern rock-formatted "Lick 101" KDRE.

According to FCC filings, the station went silent sometime around November 1, 2008, as the licensee was unable to negotiate an extension of the contract with the owner of the transmitter location. The FCC granted permission to remain silent while the station's owner put together the paperwork to move the transmitter to a new location. Since then, the transmitter has moved to a different location, the call letters have changed from KWBF-FM to KZTS, and the format has changed from Rhythmic Oldies, to Adult Album Alternative, to the current Mainstream Urban format.

With the exception of the station being the Little Rock affiliate for The Rickey Smiley Morning Show, the station had no on-air personalities. Under its previous format, KZTS' main competitor was longtime heritage urban contemporary outlet KIPR.

On March 13, 2018, it was announced by media sources that Flinn Broadcasting Corporation would sell Urban KZTS to Salem Communications for $1.1 million plus a time brokerage agreement before closing. On April 2, 2018, Salem switched the station's format and branding to their Conservative Talk "The Answer", and changed the station's call sign to KDXE on April 8, 2018. Salem's acquisition of the station was consummated on June 25, 2018.

References

External links

DXE
Radio stations established in 1994
1994 establishments in Arkansas
Conservative talk radio
Talk radio stations in the United States
Salem Media Group properties